"Taste" is a short story by Roald Dahl that was first published in the Dec 8 1951 New Yorker and the 1953 collection Someone Like You.

Plot summary 
There are six people eating a fine dinner at the house of Mike Schofield, a London stockbroker:  Mike, his wife and daughter, an unnamed narrator and his wife, and a wine connoisseur, Richard Pratt.  Pratt often makes small bets with Schofield to guess what wine is being served at the table, but during the night in the story he is uninterested, instead attempting to socialize with Schofield's eighteen-year-old daughter, Louise.

When Schofield brings the second wine of the night he remarks that it will be impossible to guess where it is from, but Pratt takes that as a challenge.  The tough talk on both sides leads the two to increase the bet until Pratt declares that he would like to bet for the hand of Schofield's daughter in marriage—if he loses, he will give Schofield both of his houses.  Though his wife and daughter are horrified, Mike eventually convinces them to accept the bet—it is simply too good a deal to pass up, especially since he is sure the wine will be impossible to identify.

However, Pratt gradually proceeds to name the exact district, commune, vineyard, and the year of the wine (though Mike doesn't turn over the bottle, his reaction appears to be one of disbelief that Pratt could have guessed correctly).  At this moment, however, the maid walks in and returns to Pratt his glasses, which he had left on the cabinet in the study earlier in the evening where the bottle had been left out to reach room temperature.  (Pratt had picked out this place in the study on an earlier visit as the ideal place to sit the wine—his glasses being left there reveals that he knew the wine in advance and cheated on the bet.)  With Pratt's deception having been revealed to all the table, Mike's wife pleads with him to calm down as he sits up angrily in his chair.

Adaptations

The story was turned into a one-act opera by William Schuman in 1989 and the 1980 Tales of the Unexpected episode "Taste".

1945 short stories
Short stories by Roald Dahl
Works originally published in Ladies' Home Journal